Eucereon amadis is a moth of the subfamily Arctiinae. It was described by Schaus in 1896. It is found in Mexico.

References

amadis
Moths described in 1896